Megan Hart is a New York Times best-selling American author of over thirty romantic and erotic novels. She also writes psychological suspense novels under the pseudonym Mina Hardy. Hart became interested in writing after reading the Ray Bradbury short story "Homecoming". Moved by this work, she rewrote her own version and began creating stories. She was inspired to write professionally after reading Stephen King's The Stand. After a long break Hart resumed writing in 1998, publishing her first book in 2002.

Hart has a degree in journalism from Indiana University of Pennsylvania. She lives in Dayton, Ohio.

Selected books
 Dirty (Harlequin Spice, 2007)
No Reservations (Virgin Books, 2009)
Collide (Harlequin Spice, 2011)
All Fall Down (2012)
Every Part of You (St. Martin's Griffin, 2014)
Don't Deny Me (St. Martin's Griffin, 2015)
Forbidden Stranger (SMP Swerve, 2018)

Awards
2009 RT Reviewers Choice Award—Erotic Fiction (Winner):  Deeper
2013 Published Weekly Starred Review: Tear You Apart
2013 RT Book Review Top Pick: Tear You Apart
2013 RT Reviewers Choice Award—Book of the Year, Winner: Tear You Apart
2013 RT Seal of Excellence: Tear You Apart
2016 RT Book Review Top Pick: Little Secrets
2016 RT Seal of Excellence: Little Secrets

References

External links 
 (Megan Hart)
 (Mina Hardy)
Fantastic Fiction: Megan Hart

21st-century American novelists
American romantic fiction writers
American women novelists
Writers from Dayton, Ohio
Novelists from Ohio
American chick lit writers
Indiana University of Pennsylvania alumni
Living people
Women romantic fiction writers
21st-century American women writers
Year of birth missing (living people)